Stomatolina rubra, common name the red stomatolina, is a species of small sea snail, a marine gastropod mollusk in the family Trochidae, the top snails.

Description
The size of the shell varies between 8 mm and 18 mm. The depressed, rather thin shell has a small, conical spire. It is reddish brown, lighter beneath, or variously variegated. The surface is covered with close fine hair-like spiral striae, and with two low keels above the periphery, the upper one nodose. There is a series of short folds below the suture. The whorls of the spire contain a beaded carina. The wide body whorl is depressed, flattened above, convex below, and impressed at the axis. The large aperture is rounded, very oblique, and iridescent within.

Distribution
This marine species occurs in the tropical Indo-West Pacific and off Korea, the Philippines and Australia (Northern Territory, Queensland, Western Australia)

References

 Wilson, B. 1993. Australian Marine Shells. Prosobranch Gastropods. Kallaroo, Western Australia : Odyssey Publishing Vol. 1 408 pp
 Poppe G.T., Tagaro S.P. & Dekker H. (2006) The Seguenziidae, Chilodontidae, Trochidae, Calliostomatidae and Solariellidae of the Philippine Islands. Visaya Supplement 2: 1–228. page(s): 104

External links
 

rubra
Gastropods described in 1822